Playlist: The Very Best of Bowling for Soup is a greatest hits album of material by American rock band Bowling for Soup, released on January 25, 2011 as part of the Playlist music album series by Legacy Recordings. The album was released by Bowling for Soup's former label without the band's consent.

Track listing
{{tracklist
| extra_column    = Original release
| title1   = Girl All the Bad Guys Want
| writer1  = Jaret Reddick, Butch Walker
| extra1   = Drunk Enough to Dance (2002)
| length1  = 3:17
| title2   = No Hablo Inglés
| writer2  = Reddick, Linus of Hollywood
| extra2   = Sorry for Partyin' (2009)
| length2  = 3:30
| title3   = Almost
| writer3  = Reddick, Walker
| extra3   = A Hangover You Don't Deserve (2004)
| length3  = 3:26
| title4   = Cody
| writer4  = Reddick, Chris Burney, Erik Chandler, Cody Garcia
| extra4   = Rock on Honorable Ones!! (1997)
| length4  = 4:20
| title5   = Everything to Me
| writer5  = 
| extra5   = ''Sorry for Partyin (2009)
| length5  = 3:53
| title6   = High School Never Ends
| writer6  = Reddick, Adam Schlesinger
| extra6   = The Great Burrito Extortion Case (2006)
| length6  = 3:29
| title7   = Punk Rock 101
| extra7   = Drunk Enough to Dance (2002)
| writer7  = Reddick, Walker
| length7  = 3:08
| title8   = The Bitch Song
| writer8  = Reddick
| extra8   = Let's Do It for Johnny!! (2000)
| length8  = 3:23
| title9   = Ohio (Come Back to Texas)
| writer9  = Reddick, Zac Maloy, Ted Bruner 
| extra9   = A Hangover You Don't Deserve (2004)
| length9  = 3:50
| title10  = I'll Always Remember You (That Way)
| note10   = feat. Kim Shattuck of The Muffs
| writer10 = 
| extra10  = My Wena EP (2009)
| length10 = 3:40
| title11  = Emily
| writer11 = Reddick
| extra11  = Drunk Enough to Dance (2002)
| length11 = 3:30
| title12  = Scope
| extra12  = Rock on Honorable Ones!! (1997)
| writer12 = Reddick
| length12 = 3:38
| title13  = 1985
| writer13 = Reddick, Mitch Allan, John Allen
| extra13  = A Hangover You Don't Deserve (2004)
| length13 = 3:13
| title14  = When We Die
| writer14 = Reddick, Walker
| extra14  = The Great Burrito Extortion Case (2006)
| length14 = 4:13
}}

PersonnelBowling for Soup: Jaret Reddick – vocals, guitar
 Erik Chandler – bass, vocals
 Chris Burney – guitar, vocals
 Gary Wiseman – drums (Tracks 1-3, 5-11, 13, and 14)
 Lance Morrill – drums (Tracks 4 and 12)Production'''
 Album cover photography - Jason Janik

References

Bowling for Soup albums
2011 greatest hits albums
Bowling for Soup